Tequexquinahuac belongs to the municipality of Texcoco de Mora in the State of Mexico, Mexico.  Tequexquinahuac is a neighborhood of approximately 2,000 inhabitants that is situated in the metropolitan zone of Mexico City, to the Oriente of the de la Ciudad de México (borough)of lago de Texcoco.  Tequexquinahuac has changed from a common town to being an important region between lago de Texcoco (one of the most  important industrialized municipalities in the state of Mexico) and Mexico City. As such, it is a clear example of the urbanization that has been taking place in Mexico in the last 80 years. Currently it is a common urban zone of the third world.

References

Populated places in the State of Mexico
Tlalnepantla de Baz